New Zealand Canadians are Canadian citizens of New Zealand descent or New Zealand-born people who reside in Canada. According to the 2016 Canadian Census there were 15,396 Canadians who claimed full or partial New Zealand ancestry.

Both are developed countries and share historical connections, language, similar customs and among others, they also have Elizabeth II as their Head of State as both are also Commonwealth realms.

Notable New Zealand Canadians
 Emma Fletcher - professional soccer player
 Daniel Gillies - actor
 Brent Hodge - filmmaker
 Alison Maclean - director
 Aaron Olson - professional basketball player
 Anna Paquin - actress
 Paige Saunders - social entrepreneur
 Yvonne De Carlo - actress

See also

 Canadian New Zealanders
 Australian Canadians

References

Canada
Ethnic groups in Canada